Larry Fuller (born July 14, 1965) is a jazz pianist based in New York City, performing in the style of mainstream jazz.  Fuller is a Yamaha-endorsed Artist and leader of the Larry Fuller Trio.  He was also the last pianist with legendary bassist Ray Brown's Trio, member of the Jeff Hamilton Trio, and member of the John Pizzarelli Quartet.  He has also performed with artists including Stanley Turrentine, Phil Woods, Clark Terry, Herb Ellis, Ernestine Anderson, John Legend, and Nicholas Payton.

Career
Larry Fuller was raised in Toledo, Ohio. He began his musical studies in jazz at the age of 11. In the early days of his career, Fuller frequently performed in the nearby cities of Detroit and Ann Arbor, Michigan.

In 1988, Fuller moved to Seattle to work with vocalist Ernestine Anderson.  For six years, Fuller was Anderson's pianist and musical director – traveling and performing worldwide.  He also recorded with Anderson, including on her Grammy-nominated CD, Now and Then, on Qwest Records.

In 1994, Fuller joined drummer Jeff Hamilton's trio.  Fuller toured and recorded several CDs in the US and Europe with the Jeff Hamilton Trio, including It's Hamilton Time, Hands On, Jeff Hamilton Trio, Live!, and Live at Steamers.

In 1998, Fuller recorded an album by the Larry Fuller Trio on Pony Boy Records, Easy Walker, with Ray Brown on bass and Jeff Hamilton on drums.  The album received the Northwest Album of the Year award in 2003, a Golden Ear Seattle Jazz Award.

In April 2000, Fuller joined the Ray Brown Trio.  Fuller was the trio's last pianist, and performed with Brown until his death in the summer of 2002.

From 2005 until 2013, Fuller performed with guitarist John Pizzarelli.  As part of the John Pizzarelli Quartet, Fuller toured throughout the United States, Europe, Japan and South America.  Some of John Pizzarelli Quartet recordings with Fuller include Double Exposure and Rockin' in Rhythm.

Today, Fuller tours and records as the band leader of the Larry Fuller Trio.  His latest album, “Overjoyed”, was released by Capri Records on May 17, 2019.  “Overjoyed” follows Fuller’s critically acclaimed, self-titled trio album released in September 2014, also on Capri Records.  Both albums topped the jazz radio chart for several consecutive months.  

In 2021, Larry Fuller became a Yamaha-endorsed Artist.

On August 28, 2022, Fuller was awarded the glass Key to the City of Toledo, Ohio “For Excellence in Jazz Music and Headlining the Inaugural Glass City Jazz Festival”.

Discography
 Overjoyed (Capri, 2019)

References

Official website for Larry Fuller
New York Times, Sunday Times Art Section, April 24, 2009
All About Jazz, Larry Fuller Trio, "Easy Walker"
All About Jazz, Interview with Ray Brown
All About Jazz Search
Pony Boy Records
Audiophile Auditions, Larry Fuller Capri Records

Living people
1965 births
American jazz pianists
American male pianists
Musicians from Toledo, Ohio
20th-century American pianists
Jazz musicians from Ohio
21st-century American pianists
20th-century American male musicians
21st-century American male musicians
American male jazz musicians